Appearances Are Deceptive (In Spanish: Las apariencias engañan) is a 1983 Mexican Drama film directed by Jaime Humberto Hermosillo and starred by Isela Vega, Gonzalo Vega and Manuel Ojeda.

Plot
Rogelio (Gonzalo Vega), a little experienced actor, is located in Mexico City by the architect Sergio (Manuel Ojeda). Sergio contracts his services of actor to travel to Aguascalientes and to pretend to be Adrián, the disappeared son of Don Alberto (Ignacio Retes), an old and paraplegic man that lives prostrate in a wheelchair. Don Alberto is taken care of by Adriana (Isela Vega), a distant niece who one day appeared suddenly in his house. Sergio and Adriana are engaged and have plans to get married and have a long honeymoon trip. For this, they hire Rogelio, because they need to keep Don Alberto company in their absence. Sergio tells Rogelio that Adrian disappeared from the life of his father being just a teenager. Sergio and Adriana have endured the situation with a series of lies to Don Alberto, including a trip to Spain, where they also hired an actor to supplant Adrian. Rogelio accepts the job, because he has severe economic needs.

Upon arriving in Aguascalientes, Sergio and Adriana receive Rogelio and give him the last details to do the impersonation. One drawback to the plan is the presence in the Don Alberto's house of Yolanda (Margarita Isabel), another nosy niece who came from Monterrey to spend a season with her uncle. Yolanda suspects Adriana, whom she does not remember, and completes to Rogelio the story that Sergio briefly told him: Don Alberto always suspected about Adrian's sexuality.

Rogelio begins to interact very closely with Adriana and Sergio, supporting Adriana in the business of Don Alberto that she handles with great success. But soon, Rogelio begins to feel a strong attraction towards Adriana. This attraction is reciprocal, but Adriana disguises it, partly for fidelity to Sergio. However, one day, Adriana can not resist and visits Rogelio in his room, where she performs oral sex. The worst comes when Sergio also begins to express a romantic interest in Rogelio and he tries to seduce him in the spas of a sports club. Rogelio reveals to Adriana the Sergio's harassment. Adriana decides to break her marriage commitment with Sergio. The return of the cousin Yolanda to her native Monterrey, leaves Adriana and Rogelio alone with Don Alberto in his house. Both become lovers, but Adriana is dedicated only to sexually stimulate Rogelio in various ways without having genital contact. Adriana is justified in having the idea of arriving virgin to the marriage, and in spite of the requests of Rogelio refuses to continue having sex with him unless they are married. She even tries to convince Rogelio to leave with Sergio on a trip he is about to make. And is that Sergio really has fallen in love with Rogelio and is willing to freely accept his homosexuality. But Rogelio rejects it.

Adriana asks Rogelio to return to Mexico City, because things have changed and she does not need his services anymore. But Rogelio refuses. Rogelio begins to act cynical in his role of Adrian to put pressure on Adriana.

One night, Rogelio visits Daniel's beauty salon. Daniel (Roberto Cobo) is the hairdresser, intimate friend and confidante of Adriana. Rogelio reveals to Daniel to know the secret of Adriana: Adriana and Adrian are the same person. Adrian since childhood was very feminine. When his mother died when he was a teenager, he disappeared mysteriously. Everyone believed that he had gone to live and study abroad. But soon appeared Adriana, a distant cousin that nobody remembers. The paraplegic condition of Don Alberto apparently made him fall into deception.

Rogelio insists on seeing Adriana, whom he has seen enter Daniel's salon. Rogelio discovers a secret apartment under the salon and to his surprise he meets Adriana. She undresses before him revealing her secret: She is a transgender woman. She is actually Adrian, and although she has taken a female identity, she still retains her male sex organs. Adriana agrees to have sex with Rogelio, who accepts the situation, and even takes the passive role during the sexual encounter.

The film ends with Adriana and Rogelio getting married and leaving for their honeymoon.

Cast
 Isela Vega as Adriana / Adrian
 Gonzalo Vega as Rogelio
 Manuel Ojeda as Sergio
 Ignacio Retes as Don Alberto
 Margarita Isabel as Yolanda
 Roberto Cobo as Daniel
 Salvador Pineda as Salvador
 La Xóchitl as Herself

Production notes
The movie was filmed in 1978. However, due to its strong and explicit content of the time, it was censored and wasn't released until 1983. The film is the first Mexican movie where the issue of transsexuality is openly discussed.

References

External links
 
 Appearances Are Deceptive in FilmAffinity.com
 Appearances Are Deceptive in Cine.com
 SalvadorNuñez.com: Do you know these five controversial LGBT-themed films made in Mexico?

1983 films
1983 LGBT-related films
Bisexuality-related films
LGBT-related comedy-drama films
Mexican LGBT-related films
LGBT-related controversies in film
Obscenity controversies in film
1980s Spanish-language films
Films about trans women
1980s Mexican films